Danilo Goffi (born 3 December 1972, in Legnano) is a former Italian long-distance runner, who specializes in the marathon. He represented his country at the 1996 Summer Olympics and has also competed at the World Championships in Athletics. He was the silver medallist in the marathon at the 1998 European Athletics Championships.

He won two times the Italian national championships of the marathon; the first time in 1995 when he was 23 years old, and the second time, 19 years after in 2014 when he was 42.

Biography
Goffi won the 1995 Venice Marathon and was part of the Italian bronze medal-winning team at the IAAF World Half Marathon Championships that year. He won the Turin Marathon in 2005 and also competed at the 2010 edition of the race, finishing in fifth place. He was the first Italian finisher at the 2011 Venice Marathon, coming in seventh place overall with his time of 2:14:41 hours.

Achievements

National titles
Italian Athletics Championships
10,000 metres: 1999
Half marathon: 1996
Marathon: 1995, 2014

See also
 Italian all-time lists - half marathon
 Italian all-time lists - Marathon

References

External links
 

1972 births
Living people
People from Legnano
Italian male long-distance runners
Italian male marathon runners
Sportspeople from the Metropolitan City of Milan
Athletes (track and field) at the 1996 Summer Olympics
Olympic athletes of Italy
European Athletics Championships medalists
World Athletics Championships athletes for Italy
Athletics competitors of Centro Sportivo Carabinieri